Itaxia falklandica is a species of sea slug, an aeolid nudibranch, a marine gastropod mollusc in the family Flabellinidae.

Distribution
This species was described from the Falkland Islands. It has been reported from Chiloé Island, Chile, South Georgia and Crozet Islands.

References

Flabellinidae
Gastropods described in 1907